Damsah (F102) is the second ship of the s built for the Qatari Emiri Navy.

Development 
Fincantieri showcased for the first time the multi-role air defence corvettes for the Qatari Emiri Navy during DIMDEX 2018. In August 2017, Qatar officially announced for the order of the 4 ships of the class after signing the contract in June 2016.

They are able to operate high speed boats such as rigid-hulled inflatable boats with the help of lateral cranes and hauling ramps. All four of the Doha class will serve as the backbone of the Qatari Emiri Navy.

Construction and career 
Damsah was launched on 13 February 2021 at Fincantieri shipyard in Muggiano, Italy.

References

External links
 Military Factory

2021 ships
Doha-class corvettes